Panega Glacier on Varna Peninsula, Livingston Island in the South Shetland Islands, Antarctica is situated southeast of the northeastern portion of Saedinenie Snowfield, south of Rose Valley Glacier, southwest of Debelt Glacier and north of lower Kaliakra Glacier. It drains the southeast slopes of Vidin Heights and flows into Moon Bay between Helis Nunatak and Perperek Knoll. It is named after Zlatna Panega River in northern Bulgaria.

Location

See also
 List of glaciers in the Antarctic
 Glaciology

Maps
 L.L. Ivanov et al. Antarctica: Livingston Island and Greenwich Island, South Shetland Islands. Scale 1:100000 topographic map. Sofia: Antarctic Place-names Commission of Bulgaria, 2005.
 L.L. Ivanov. Antarctica: Livingston Island and Greenwich, Robert, Snow and Smith Islands. Scale 1:120000 topographic map.  Troyan: Manfred Wörner Foundation, 2009.  
 Antarctic Digital Database (ADD). Scale 1:250000 topographic map of Antarctica. Scientific Committee on Antarctic Research (SCAR). Since 1993, regularly upgraded and updated.
 A. Kamburov and L. Ivanov. Bowles Ridge and Central Tangra Mountains: Livingston Island, Antarctica. Scale 1:25000 map. Sofia: Manfred Wörner Foundation, 2023.

References
 Panega Glacier. SCAR Composite Antarctic Gazetteer.
 Bulgarian Antarctic Gazetteer. Antarctic Place-names Commission. (details in Bulgarian, basic data in English)

External links
 Panega Glacier. Copernix satellite image

 

Glaciers of Livingston Island